Silver trifluoromethanesulfonate, or silver triflate is the triflate (CF3SO3−) salt of Ag+. It is a white or colorless solid that is soluble in water and some organic solvents including, benzene.  It is a reagent used in the synthesis of organic and inorganic triflates.

Synthesis
An early preparation method starts from the barium salt of trifluoromethanesulfonic acid (TfOH), from which the free TfOH is formed with dilute sulfuric acid, which is then neutralized with silver carbonate (Ag2CO3).

Ba^2+[{^-}OSO2CF3]2 ->[\ce{H2SO4}][-\ce{BaSO4}] CF3SO2OH ->[\ce{Ag2CO3}] CF3SO2O^- Ag+

The silver triflate is thereby obtained in a yield of 95% and can be recrystallized from benzene/tetrachloromethane or ether/tetrachloromethane for purification.

In an improved version by George Whitesides, dilute TfOH is reacted with silver(I)oxide (Ag2O), which produces AgOTf in 98% yield.

Reactions
It is used to prepare alkyl triflates from alkyl halides: 
CF3SO2OAg + RX → CF3SO2OR + AgX (X = iodide usually)

In coordination chemistry, the salt is also useful to replace halide ligands with the more labile triflate ligand. For example, bromopentacarbonylrhenium can be converted to the more labile derivative using silver triflate:
CF3SO2OAg + BrRe(CO)5 → CF3SO2ORe(CO)5 + AgBr

References

Silver compounds
Triflates